The 2017 F4 Japanese Championship was the third season of the F4 Japanese Championship. It began on 7 April in Okayama and finished on 12 November on Twin Ring Motegi after seven double header rounds. Ritomo Miyata defended his drivers' title successfully, continuing with TOM'S Spirit.

Teams and drivers
The teams were announced on 11 March 2017.

Race calendar and results
All rounds were held in Japan and were part of the Super GT events.

Championship standings

Only the best thirteen results counted towards the championship. Points were awarded to the top 10 classified finishers in each race. No points are awarded for pole position or fastest lap.

Drivers' standings

Teams' standings

References

External links
  

Japanese F4 Championship seasons
Japanese
F4 Japanese Championship
Japanese Formula 4